Ernest Page Lee (27 August 1862 – 19 February 1932) was a New Zealand lawyer and politician of the Reform Party.

Early life
Born in 1862 in Teignmouth, England, he received his education at Cheltenham and London. Aged 18, he started learning the legal trade in a firm of solicitors in the West of England. He was submitted to the Supreme Court of Judicature in 1885. A year later, he emigrated to New Zealand. He settled in Oamaru, and was at first a clerk in a legal firm owned by Thomas William Hislop and Arthur Gethin Creagh. He founded the firm of Lee, Grave and Grave. In 1895 married Miss de Lambert. His sister, Leah Lee, was married to the French poet Jules Laforgue.

Political career

Lee was elected onto the Oamaru Borough council. He represented the electorate until 1922, when he was defeated in the 1922 election. The 1922 Oamaru election result was invalidated due to irregularities, but Lee lost the subsequent 1923 by-election again to John MacPherson of the Liberal Party. He won the electorate from MacPherson in 1925, but again lost it to MacPherson in 1928.

He was the Minister of Justice (3 April 1920 – 13 January 1923), Minister of External Affairs (17 May 1920 – 13 January 1923) and Minister of Industries and Commerce (22 June 1920 – 13 January 1923) in the Reform Government.

Outside politics
Lee founded the North Otago Jockey Club. He was an accomplished mountaineer and ascended many of the high peaks of the Southern Alps. He was on Lake Wakatipu when he had a seizure. He died three weeks later on 19 February 1932 at Queenstown, and was survived by his wife.

Notes

References

|-

1862 births
1932 deaths
English emigrants to New Zealand
Members of the Cabinet of New Zealand
Reform Party (New Zealand) MPs
New Zealand foreign ministers
19th-century New Zealand lawyers
People from Teignmouth
People from Oamaru
Unsuccessful candidates in the 1922 New Zealand general election
Unsuccessful candidates in the 1928 New Zealand general election
Members of the New Zealand House of Representatives
New Zealand MPs for South Island electorates
20th-century New Zealand lawyers
Justice ministers of New Zealand